John Gary Brenneman (born January 5, 1943) is a Canadian former professional ice hockey player. He played in the National Hockey League between 1964 and 1969 with the Chicago Black Hawks, New York Rangers, Toronto Maple Leafs, Detroit Red Wings, and Oakland Seals. In 159 games he scored 21 goals and 19 assists as a left winger.

Career
Brenneman played OHA junior hockey in the Chicago Black Hawks organization, playing for the St. Catharines Teepees from 1959 through 1962 and the St. Catharines Black Hawks in 1962–3. While still in his final year of junior he played 4 games for the AHL's Buffalo Bisons, scoring a goal. The next season saw Brenneman post impressive offensive totals with the St. Louis Braves of the CPHL. In 1964–65 he split the season amongst the Braves and two NHL teams, the Chicago Black Hawks, for whom he appeared in 17 games and scored a goal, and the New York Rangers, collecting 3 goals and 3 assists in 22 contests.

Brenneman remained in the Rangers organization for the following season, going scoreless in 11 games with the parent club while playing again in the CPHL for the Minnesota Rangers and the AHL with the Baltimore Clippers. For 1966–67, Brenneman played split time between the AHL's Rochester Americans and NHL's Toronto Maple Leafs. He played 41 regular season games for Toronto, qualifying to be on the cup.  However, Brenneman's name was left off the cup, because he was sent to the minors before the playoffs.

Brenneman spent the following seasons split between the Detroit Red Wings organization, where he played 9 games and scored 2 assists for the parent club, and the Oakland Seals, for whom he appeared in 31 games and scored 10 goals and 8 assists in 31 games. He remained with Oakland for the following season, scoring a goal and collecting 2 assists in 21 games. Following a season when did not play pro hockey, Brenneman played 1970–71 in the IHL with the Dayton Gems, scoring 41 points in 50 games.

In 1974–5, Brenneman returned to pro hockey, joining Austrian club Innsbrucker EV, for whom he collected 18 goals and 31 points in 28 games.

Career statistics

Regular season and playoffs

External links
 

1943 births
Living people
Baltimore Clippers players
Buffalo Bisons (AHL) players
Canadian expatriate ice hockey players in the United States
Canadian ice hockey left wingers
Chicago Blackhawks players
Cleveland Barons (1937–1973) players
Dayton Gems players
Fort Worth Wings players
Ice hockey people from Ontario
Innsbrucker EV players
Minnesota Rangers players
New York Rangers players
Oakland Seals players
Sportspeople from Fort Erie, Ontario
St. Catharines Black Hawks players
St. Catharines Teepees players
St. Louis Braves players
San Diego Gulls (WHL) players
Stanley Cup champions
Toronto Maple Leafs players